Van Engelen is a Dutch toponymic surname, meaning "from Engelen". Notable people with the surname include:

Anthony Van Engelen (born 1978), American skateboarder
Ton van Engelen (born 1950), Dutch footballer
Yvo van Engelen (born 1985), Dutch footballer

See also
Engelen (surname)

Dutch-language surnames
Surnames of Dutch origin